GNU Dr. Geo is interactive geometry software that allows its users to design & manipulate interactive geometric sketches. It is free software (source code, translations, icons and installer are released under GNU GPL license), created by Hilaire Fernandes, it is part of the GNU project.
It runs over a Morphic graphic system (which means that it runs on Linux, Mac OS, Windows, Android). Current version of Dr. Geo is also called Dr. Geo II. Historically Dr. Geo was developed in C++ and Dr. Geo II is a complete rewrite using Pharo that happened in 2005. This article refers to the most recent version.

Objects 
Dr. Geo manipulates different kinds of objects such as points, lines, circles, block of code.

Points 
Dr. Geo has several kinds of points: a free point, which can be moved with the mouse (but may be attached to a curve) and a point given by its coordinates.

Points can also be created as the intersection of 2 curves or as the midpoint of a segment.

Lines 
Dr. Geo is equipped with the classic line, ray, segment and vector.

Other curvilinear objects include circles (defined by 2 points, a center and segment or a radius), arcs (defined by three points or center and angle), polygons (regular or not, defined by end points), and loci.

Transformations 
Besides the parallel and perpendicular line through a point, Dr. Geo can apply to a point or a line one of these transformations:

 reflexion
 symmetry
 translation
 rotation
 homothety

Macro-construction 
Dr. Geo comes with macro-construction: a way to teach Dr. Geo new constructions. It allows to add new objects to Dr. Geo: new transformations like circle inversion, tedious constructions involving a lot of intermediate objects or constructions involving script (also named macro-script).

When some objects, called final depend on other objects, called initial, it is possible to create a complex construction deducing the final objects from the user-given initial objects. This is a macro-construction, a graph of interdependent objects.

Programming 

Access to user programming is at the essence of Dr. Geo: from the software, the user can directly read, study, modify and redistribute modified version of Dr. Geo. Additionally, scripting embedded in sketch is proposed.

Dr. Geo source code is Pharo. It is also the language used for user programming: to extend Dr. Geo with arbitrary computing operations (Pharo script) and to define a geometric sketch entirely with programming instructions (Pharo sketch).

Dr. Geo is shipped with its source code and the developer tools. Therefore its code can be edited and recompiled from Dr. Geo while it is functioning. This design, inherited from Pharo, makes easy to test new ideas and new designs.

Pharo script 

A script is a first class object defined along Dr. Geo code. It comes with zero, one or several arguments, from types selected when defining the script. When an instance of a script is plugged in a canvas, the user first selects its arguments in the canvas with mouse clicks, then the position in the canvas of the script output. The script is updated at each canvas computation. Scripts can be used in cascade, with one as the argument of another one.

Script are designed to be used in two different ways:
 To output an object (i.e. a numeric value) and to show its result in the canvas. This result can be used when building subsequent objects (geometric or script).
 To access objects in the canvas: model (MathItem) or view (Costume) for arbitrary uses and modifications. For example to modify the colour of an object given the result to a computation.

From the script, the arguments model are reached with the methods #arg1, #arg2, etc. The arguments view are reached with the methods #costume1, #costume2, etc.

The computation of the script is done in its #compute method. For example, to calculate the square of a number, the script
compute
"returns the square of a number"
^ self arg1 valueItem squared

creates a numeric object, whose value is the square of the argument number object. Whenever the first number is changed, the script returned value changes too.

Pharo sketch 
Dr. Geo Pharo sketches are sketches entirely defined in the Pharo language. This is not about constructing a sketch with the Dr. Geo graphical interface, but about describing a sketch with the Pharo language. A programming interface with an easy and light syntax is provided.

Sierpinski triangle
Here is how to program a Sierpinski triangle recursively:

| triangle c |
c := DrGeoSketch new.
triangle := [].
triangle := [:s1 :s2 :s3 :n |
    c segment: s1 to: s2; segment: s2 to: s3; segment: s3 to: s1.
    n >0 ifTrue: [
        triangle
            value: s1
            value: (c middleOf: s1 and: s2) hide
            value: (c middleOf: s1 and: s3) hide
            value: n-1.
        triangle
            value: (c middleOf: s1 and: s2) hide
            value: s2
            value: (c middleOf: s2 and: s3) hide
            value: n-1.
        triangle
            value: (c middleOf: s1 and: s3) hide
            value: (c middleOf: s2 and: s3) hide
            value: s3
            value: n-1]].
triangle value: 0@3 value:  4@ -3 value: -4@ -3 value: 3.
(c point: 0@3) show

Fibonacci spiral
A Fibonacci spiral programmed with geometric transformations (rotation, translation and homothety):

|canvas shape alfa fibo a b m s|
canvas := DrGeoSketch new fullscreen.
alfa := (canvas freeValue: -90 degreesToRadians) hide.
shape := [:c :o :f| | e p |
	e := (canvas rotate: o center: c angle: alfa) hide.
	(canvas arcCenter: c from: o to: e) large.
	p := canvas translate: e vector: (canvas vector: c to: o) hide.
	(canvas polygon: { c. o. p hide. e }) name: f.
	e].
fibo := [ ].
fibo := [ :f :o :c :k | | e f1 f2 f3 c2|
"f1: term Fn-1, f2: term Fn, o & c: origin and center of spiral arm
e: extremity of the spiral arm"
	f1 := f first.
	f2 := f second.
	f3 := f1 + f2.
	e := shape value: c value: o value: f3.	
	c2 := (canvas scale: c center: e factor: f3 / f2) hide.
	k > 0 ifTrue: [ fibo value: {f2. f3} value: e value: c2 value: k - 1 ]].

a := canvas point: 1@0.
b := canvas point: -1 @0.
m := (canvas middleOf: a and: b) hide.
s := shape value: m value: a value: 1.
shape value: m value: s value: 1.
fibo value: {1. 2} value: b value: a value: 10

Newton-Raphson algorithm 
Pharo sktech can be used to design interactive sketch demonstrating numerical analysis method:

| sketch f df xn ptA ptB|
sketch := DrGeoSketch new axesOn.
xn := 2.
f := [ :x | x cos + x ].
"Derivate number"
df := [ :x | (f value: x + 1e-8) - (f value: x) * 1e8].
sketch plot: f from: -20 to: 20.
ptA := (sketch point: xn@0) large; name: 'Drag me'.
5 timesRepeat: [ 
	ptB := sketch 
		point: [ :pt | pt point x @ (f value: pt point x)] 
		parent: ptA.
	ptB hide.
	(sketch segment: ptA to: ptB) dotted forwardArrow .
	ptA := sketch point: [:pt | 
		| x |
		x := pt point x.
		x - ( (f value: x) / (df value: x) )  @ 0 ] parent: ptB.
	ptA hide.
	(sketch segment: ptB to: ptA) dotted forwardArrow].

Circumscribed circle in French
A French version of the Pharo sketch API makes possible writing source code in this language:

| figure a b c m1 m2|
figure := DrGeoSketch nouveau.
figure pleinEcran; afficherGrille; afficherAxes.
a := figure segmentDe: 2@ 3 a: 0@0.
a nommer: 'a'.
b := figure segmentDe: 0@0 a: -1@2.
b nommer: 'b'.
c := figure segmentDe: -1@2 a: 2@3.
c nommer: 'c'.
m1 := (figure mediatrice: a) couleur: Color red.
m2 := (figure mediatrice: b) couleur: Color red.
(figure mediatrice: c) couleur: Color red.
figure cercleCentre: (figure intersectionDe: m1 et: m2) passantPar: 0@0.
(figure point: 0@0) montrer

Awards
 ESUG Innovation Technology Awards (Amsterdam, 2008)
 AFUL Free Software Awards (Paris, 2000)

See also
 Compass-and-straightedge construction
 Interactive geometry software

References

External links
Official website
User guide
Download source code and Windows, Linux and Mac versions
Pharo official web site

Educational software for Linux
Free educational software
Free interactive geometry software